Euclemensia caminopa is a moth in the family Cosmopterigidae. It was described by Edward Meyrick in 1937. It is found in Trinidad.

The forewings are indigo blue with crimson-red markings.

References

Moths described in 1937
Antequerinae